Old England may refer to:

 Old England (department store), a famous former retailer in central Brussels, Belgium
 Old England (horse), a racehorse
 Merry Old England
 "Old England", a song by The Waterboys on their album "This Is the Sea"
 Old England, an Art Nouveau building in Brussels housing the Musical Instrument Museum
 "The Roast Beef of Old England", a 1731 English patriotic ballad.
 Early medieval England, specifically before the Norman invasion

See also 
 Anglia (peninsula)
 Ye olde
 Old English (disambiguation)
 England
 English (disambiguation)
 New England (disambiguation)